Champua is a Vidhan Sabha constituency of Kendujhar district.
Area of this constituency includes Joda, Barbil, Joda block and 17 GPs (Kodagadia, Jamudalak, Rajia, Kalikaprasad, Rimuli, Badanai, Sarei, Champua, Kutariposi, Sunaposi, Karanjia, Rangamatia, Uchabali, Bhanda, Kashipal, Padua and Chandrasekharpur) of Champua block.

In 2014 election Independent candidate Mr. Sanatan Mahakud, defeated Biju Janata Dal candidate the Oriya comedy king Tatwa Prakash Satpathy (Papu Pom Pom) by a margin of approx. 14000 votes, while in previous 2009 election Independent candidate Jitu Patnaik, defeated then Indian National Congress candidate Mr. Sanatan Mahakud by a margin of only 145 votes.

Elected Members

14 elections held during 1951 to 2014. List of members elected from Champua Vidhan Sabha constituency are:

2019: (25): Minakshi Mahanta (Biju Janata Dal)
2014: (25): Sanatan Mahakud  (Independent)
2009: (25): Jitu Patnaik (Independent)
2004: (142): Dhanurjay Sidu (Congress)
2000: (142): Saharai Oram (Independent)
1995: (142): Dhanurjay Laguri (Congress)
1990: (142): Saharai Oram (Janata Dal)
1985: (142): Dhanurjay Laguri (Congress)
1980: (142): Saharai Oram  (Janata-S)
1977: (142): Saharai Oram (Janata Party)
1974: (142): Gurucharan Nayak (Congress) 
1971: (127): Saharai Oram (Utkal Congress) 
1967: (127): Kshetra Mohan Nayak (Swatantra) 
1961: (67): Gurucharan Nayak (Ganatantra Parishad)
1957: (46): Rajaballav Mishra (Ganatantra Parishad) and Gurucharan Nayak (Ganatantra Parishad)
1951: (40): Gurucharan Nayak (Ganatantra Parishad)

2019 Election Result

2014 Election Result

Summary of results of the 2009 Election

Notes

References

Kendujhar district
Assembly constituencies of Odisha